James Snyder may refer to:

James Snyder (actor) (born 1981), American actor and singer
James Snyder (art historian) (1928-1990), American specialist in Northern Renaissance art, taught at Bryn Mawr
James Snyder Jr. (born 1945), American author, attorney and politician
James L. Snyder (born 1951), American writer
James S. Snyder (born 1952), American director and historian
Jim Snyder (coach) (1919–1994), American basketball coach
Jim Snyder (journalist) (born 1965), American journalist
Jim Snyder (second baseman) (1932–2021), American baseball player and coach
Jim Snyder (shortstop) (1847–1922), American baseball player
Jimmy Snyder (musician) (born 1934), American musician
Jimmy Snyder (racing driver) (1909–1939), American race car driver
Jimmy Snyder (sports commentator) (1918–1996), also known as Jimmy the Greek, American sports commentator
Dan Green (voice actor) (James Hadley Snyder, born 1971), American voice actor